Drăgășani is a city in Vâlcea County, Romania, near the right bank of the Olt river, and on the railway between Caracal and Râmnicu Vâlcea. The city is well known for the vineyards on the neighboring hills that produce some of the best Wallachian wines.

The city administers four villages: Capu Dealului, Valea Caselor, Zărneni and Zlătărei. It is situated in the historical region of Oltenia.

History 

Drăgășani stands on the site of the Daco-Roman Rusidava. On 19 June 1821, during the Greek War of Independence, the Ottomans routed the Filiki Eteria troops of Alexander Ypsilantis near the city in the Battle of Dragashani.
There Tudor Vladimirescu fought with his Panduri, revolutionary fighters consisting mainly of peasants and not armed with firepower, against the Turks.

Notable people 
 Florin Costea
 Mihai Costea
 Alexandru Dandea
 Mugur Isărescu
 Gib Mihăescu
 Adrian Păun

Notes 

 
Cities in Romania
Populated places in Vâlcea County
Wine regions of Romania
Localities in Oltenia